The reversed half H (Ꟶ or ꟶ) was an epigraphic letter used in Latin inscriptions from Roman Gaul.
In French epigraphy works, it is called , "halved H".

History

It may or not be related to the characters  and  used by Aristophanes of Byzantium to represent the rough breathing and smooth breathing of Greek around 200 BC.

It represents the aspirate h or rough breathing.

The half H is found in Latin inscriptions of Gaul, particularly the areas of Lugdunum (Lyon) and Nemausus (Nîmes) in modern France.
Of the variant forms of H found in inscriptions, the reversed half H is the only one commonly distinguished from the ordinary H in diplomatic transcriptions.

A few authors have considered the reversed half H to be a ligature of H with the preceding letter, but  and catalogues of local inscriptions treat the reversed half H as a distinct letter.

Unicode
The letter was introduced in Unicode 13 (March 2020).
While the inscriptions show only uppercase forms, a lowercase version has also been entered into Unicode to allow epigraphists to discuss words in appropriate cases.
It is named "reversed" to make a difference with the previous half H .

See also
 Claudian letter 
 Heta

References 

 

Gallo-Roman culture
Epigraphic letter variants